Algeria competed at the 1968 Summer Olympics in Mexico City, Mexico.

Boxing

Gymnastics

Men's

References
Official Olympic Reports
Part Three: Results

Nations at the 1968 Summer Olympics
1968
Olympics